"Sneakers" is a song recorded by South Korean girl group Itzy. It was released on July 15, 2022, by JYP Entertainment and Republic Records, as the lead single for their fifth extended play Checkmate.  Both Korean and English versions of the song were included in the extended play. The electro-pop track was written and produced by Didrik Thott, Jessica Pierpoint, Sebastian Thott, Friday, and Ogi (Galactika). An accompanying music video was released alongside the single on YouTube featuring a royal concept.

Commercially, "Sneakers" peaked at number five on the Circle Digital Chart, becoming Itzy's highest-charting single since "Dalla Dalla" in 2019 and the group's second top-five entry on the chart. The song also peaked at number one on Billboards South Korea Songs chart. Following its release, Itzy promoted the song with live performances on several South Korean music television programs and amassed three music show trophies.

Background and release 
On June 2, 2022, JYP Entertainment announced that Itzy would be releasing their fifth Korean extended play titled Checkmate on July 15, after nearly nine months since their last release Crazy in Love with "Sneakers" announced as the lead single. On June 13, the group teaser photo was released. On July 11, a highlight medley teaser video was released. On July 12, the music video teaser was released. The song along with the music video was released on July 15.

Composition 
The song was written by Friday (Galactika), OGI (Galactika), Didrik Thott and Jessica Pierpoint and composed by Didrik Thott, Jessica Pierpoint and Sebastian Thott and arranged by Sebastian Thott. The English version was written by Friday (Galactika), OGI (Galactika), Didrik Thott and Jessica Pierpoint and Sophia Pae. "Sneakers" is written in both English and Korean and is composed in the key of G major, with a tempo of 120 beats per minute. Lyrically, it tells the listeners to run farther together to the moment you feel most free, wearing the sneakers that make you feel good. Rolling Stone India wrote that "Itzy's "Sneakers" undoubtedly serves as an additional chapter in the group’s growing discography, which shares stories of living life without being force-fitted into a mold".

Music video

Background 

On 12 July, a 20-second teaser clip was released. Again on 13 July, a 15-second teaser clip was also released. Both clips reached more than 7 million views before the release. The accompanying music video was released on JYP Entertainment's YouTube channel on July 15, 2022 coinciding the album's release.

Synopsis and reception 
The music video is produced by SL8 Visual Lab and it was directed by 725. The music video opens with Yeji wearing an extravagant gown walking in a hallway with framed pictures of purple sneakers. The next scene shows the quintet decked out in jewels, dancing and singing in a luxurious palace with a grand surrounding of thrones, statues, chandeliers and most notably a structure of a sneaker made using marble. The scene shifts to a military control center where they are assuming command. Later in the clip, the girl group showcase their fierce choreography on an outer space sneaker store. And in signature Itzy fashion, the music video ends with the group strutting their iconic 'crown' pose. Writer Gladys Yeo from NME reviewed the music video as playful.

Promotion 
Prior to the album's release, on July 15, 2022, Itzy held a live event in collaboration with Mnet called "Itzy Comeback Special CHECKMATE" to introduce the album and communicate with their fans. Following the release of the album, the group performed  "Sneakers" on July 15 at KBS2's Music Bank. Followed by a performance on the popular American music program "MTV Fresh Out Live" on the morning of the 16th, they also promoted on  MBC's Show! Music Core, SBS's Inkigayo on the 17th of July, they also performed on The Late Show with Stephen Colbert on July 22 for the talk show's "#LateShowMeMusic" series to promote the song.

Accolades

Credits and personnel 
Credits adapted from Melon.

Studio
 JYPE Studios – recording
 Studio Nomad – digital editing
 Chapel Swing Studios – mixing
 821 Sound Mastering – mastering

Personnel

 Itzy – lead vocals
 J.Y. Park "The Asiansoul" – production
 Friday (Galactika) – lyrics, vocal direction
 OGI (Galactika)  – lyrics
 Didrik Thott – lyrics, composition
 Jessica Pierpoint – lyrics, composition
 Sebastian Thott– composition, arrangement, computer programming, keyboard
 Aiden – background vocals
 Sophia Pae – background vocals, English lyrics
 Choi – digital editing
 Yue – digital editing
 Park Eun-jung – recording
 Eom Se-hee – recording
 Lee Sang-yeop – recording
 Koo Hye-jin – recording
 Tony Maserati – mixing
 David K. Younghyun – mixing
 Valley Glen – mixing
 Kwon Nam-woo – mastering

Charts

Weekly charts

Monthly charts

Year-end charts

Release history

References 

2022 songs
2022 singles
Itzy songs
JYP Entertainment singles
Songs written by Didrik Thott
Songs written by Sebastian Thott
Republic Records singles